Anson Funderburgh (born James Anson Funderburgh; November 14, 1954) is an American blues guitar player and bandleader of Anson Funderburgh and the Rockets since 1978. Their style incorporates both Chicago blues and Texas blues.

Career
Funderburgh was born in Plano, Texas, United States. Anson was with The Bee's Knees in 1976 and recorded "Cold Hearted Woman". In 1977 the Rockets began with Anson, Mark Hickman on Fender bass, David Watson on drums and vocalist Darrell Nulisch. In 1981, Funderburgh released the Rockets' debut album Talk to You By Hand from New Orleans, Louisiana based Black Top Records. The band consisted of Anson, with Darrell Nulisch on vocals and harmonica. The album included a cover version of Earl King's song, "Come On". Talk to You By Hand was also the first ever release by the record label.

Before the debut album's release in 1981, Funderburgh participated that same year with The Fabulous Thunderbirds in recording of their Butt-Rockin''' album.

Funderburgh and the Rockets appeared at the 1984 San Francisco Blues Festival. When Nulisch left the band in 1985, Funderburgh invited the blues harmonica player Sam Myers from Jackson, Mississippi to fill in the spot. He stayed with the band until his death on July 17, 2006, appearing on eight albums with them. The first Rockets' recording featuring Myers was My Love Is Here To Stay which came out in 1986.

Anson Funderburgh and the Rockets appeared in the 1994 film China Moon, starring Ed Harris and Madeleine Stowe. They are shown playing "Tell Me What I Want To Hear" from the self-titled release. As well as the studio recordings, in 1990 the band played the  Long Beach Blues Festival. The same year, they appeared on show number 109 of the NBC television program, Sunday Night.

In 1989 and 1990 the band's bassist was Mike Judge, future animator and creator of Beavis and Butt-head and King of the Hill. Their song "Can We Get Together" was also featured in the film, 21 Grams in 2003.

In 2007, Funderburgh played on and produced John Németh's album, Magic Touch. Németh had briefly replaced Myers in Funderburgh's backing band.

In 2011, The Mill Block Blues album was released. The CD was unique in that a portion of the sales of the album was donated to help fellow musicians in need via the HART Fund.  The HART Fund (Handy Artist Relief Trust) is a service provided by the Blues Foundation which provides for acute, chronic and preventive medical and dental care as well as funeral expenses for blues musicians.

In October 2012, was the first U.S. and European tour of Golden State / Lone Star Revue, an All Star package that included Funderburgh, Little Charlie Baty on guitar, former Rockets drummer Wes Starr, bassist Richard W. Grigsby and leader, harmonicist and singer Mark Hummel. The quintet was featured on Hummel's 2014 release on Electro-Fi Records, The Hustle Is Really On, nominated for a Blues Music Award for 'Best Traditional Blues Album' in 2015.

In 2013, Funderburgh produced and featured on The Andy T Band's Drink Drank Drunk, released on Delta Groove.

In 2014, he was nominated for a Blues Music Award in the 'Best Instrumentalist – Guitar' category.

More recently, Funderburgh co-produced Dany Franchi's album, Problem Child (2018). He also produced Breezy Rodio's 2022 album, Underground Blues.

Discography
1981: Talk to You By Hand (Black Top)
1985: She Knocks Me Out! (Black Top)
1986: My Love Is Here To Stay (Black Top)
1987: Sins (Black Top)
1990: Rack 'Em Up (Black Top)
1991: Tell Me What I Want to Hear (Black Top)
1991: Thru the Years: A Retrospective (Black Top)
1995: Live At the Grand Emporium (Black Top)
1997: That's What They Want (Black Top)
1999: Change In My Pocket (Bullseye Blues)
2003: Which Way Is Texas?  (Bullseye Blues)
2011: Mill Block Blues (Ruff Kutt)
2013: Deal With It (EllerSoul Records)
2013: Drink Drank Drunk (Produced, featured) (Delta Groove Productions)
2014: The Hustle Is Really On (Mark Hummel) Golden State/Lone Star Revue (Electro-Fi Records)
2016: Golden State/Lone Star Blues Revue'' Golden State/Lone Star Revue (Electro Fi-produced, featured)

See also
List of blues musicians

References

External links
Anson Funderburgh's web site

1954 births
Living people
American blues guitarists
American male guitarists
People from Plano, Texas
Texas blues musicians
Chicago blues musicians
Black Top Records artists
Contemporary blues musicians
Guitarists from Illinois
Guitarists from Texas
20th-century American guitarists
20th-century American male musicians